Latvia–Russia border is the state border between Republic of Latvia (EU member) and the Russian Federation (CIS member). It is an external border of the European Union.

History

The Pskov region and Latvia have had historical ties since the founding of the Pskov Republic in the 13th century. From 1925 to 1945 Abrene County was part of the Republic of Latvia. Following the Soviet occupation, on 16 January 1945 the area was transferred from the Latvian Soviet Socialist Republic to Pskov Oblast and renamed Pytalovsky District. After regaining independence in 1991, Latvia initially claimed the previous Latvian territory, on the basis of the 1920 Latvian–Soviet Peace Treaty. The delimitation of the border was completed in 1998, but the treaty on the state border was signed and ratified only on 27 March 2007. It recognised the Pytalovsky District as part of Russia.

Overview
According to the 2007 agreement on the Russian-Latvian State Border, the state border between Latvia and Russia starting from the intersection point of the state borders of Latvia, Russia and Belarus, and ends with the joint borders of Latvia, Russia and Estonia.

Latvia borders only one oblast of Russia, the Pskov Oblast. Russia borders three Latvian municipalities.

The access-restricted Border Security Zone of Russia lies along the border on the Russian side. In order to visit this zone, a permit issued by the local FSB department is required (the only exceptions are international border transit points).

Border crossings
Crossing the border is allowed only at border controls. Most people need a visa on one or both sides of the border. Listed from north:
 road P42 near Pededze
 road P35 near Viļaka (Vientuļi)
 railway Rēzekne–Pskov (Saint Petersburg–Warsaw Railway) near Kārsava
 road E262 / A13 / A116 near Kārsava and Grebņeva
 road P50 near Kārsava and Goliševa
 railway Rēzekne–Velikiye Luki (Moscow–Riga Railway) near Zilupe
 road E22 / A12 / M9 near Zilupe and Terehova

Border crossings can also be done by air travel. The only international airport in Latvia is Riga International Airport which has scheduled flights among other places to Moscow and Saint Petersburg. The airports at Daugavpils, Liepāja, Jūrmala-Tukuma and Ventspils are also registered as border crossing points.

Following the mobilization announced in Russia related to the 2022 Russian invasion of Ukraine in September, Latvia declared state emergency for three months in border counties and closed the Pededze crossing.

See also 
Masļenki border incident

References 

 
European Union external borders
Borders of Russia
Latvia–Russia relations
Borders of Latvia
International borders
Internal borders of the Soviet Union